The 1988 United States presidential election in Maryland took place on November 8, 1988, as part of the 1988 United States presidential election. Voters chose 10 representatives, or electors to the Electoral College, who voted for president and vice president.

Maryland was won by Vice President George H.W. Bush (R-Texas), with 51.11% of the popular vote, over Massachusetts Governor Mike Dukakis (D-Massachusetts) with 48.20% of the popular vote. Bush ultimately won the national vote, defeating Governor Dukakis.

 this remains the last time that the Republican presidential candidate has won the state of Maryland, as well as Baltimore County and Howard County. Maryland was one of only two states that Bush carried in 1988 which had voted for Jimmy Carter in 1980, the other being Carter's home state of Georgia. This also marks the only occasion since 1952 in which Maryland has given an outright majority to a non-incumbent Republican.

Maryland weighed in for this election as almost 5% more Democratic than the nation-at-large.

Results

Results by county

Counties that flipped from Republican to Democratic
Montgomery

By congressional district
Bush won 4 of 8 congressional districts, including three held by Democrats. Dukakis won the other 4, including one that elected a Republican.

See also
 United States presidential elections in Maryland
 1988 United States presidential election
 1988 United States elections

Notes

References 

Maryland
1988
Presidential